Chandahandi is a town and Block in Nabarangpur District in Odisha State in India.

Demographics
 census, the block had a total population of 61076, which consists of 30350 male and 30726 female. Total SC (Scheduled Caste) and ST (Scheduled Tribe) population was 6,479 and 20,276 respectively. According to census 2011 information the sub-district code of Chandahandi Block (CD) is 03190. Total area of chandahandi tehsil is 265 km².According to Census 2011, the block had a total of 73,953, which constitutes 36,460 males and 37,493 females across 89 census villages.

Art and culture

As this place is happened to be a town of Nabarangpur District has an old tradition of Art and Culture, People of the tehsil perform folk dance like Geet Kudia, Ghumura, Banabadi, Madhia, Samparda, Sankirtann etc. Rath Jatra, Dusshera (Dasahara), Holi and Mahasivaratri all these Hindu festivals are celebrated together by the town people.

Festivals
Mondei (Derived from Hindi word "Mondi" means "small market") is a local festival and is a huge celebration in this town and Nabarangpur District. Most people of the town as well as the district celebrates the festival by worshipping a common presiding deity. Generally this festival is celebrated after harvesting of crops. During the festival many entertainment programmes like plays, opera, melody and folk dances are performed whole night. To watch this large no. of men and women comes from all corner of the Nabarangpur district.
Holi, Dussehra, Ratha Yatra, Nua khai, Bol Bum, Kalasi etc. are among festivals that are celebrated in the Chandahandi Tehsil.

References

Cities and towns in Nabarangpur district